Warren Reynolds (born 26 May 1936) is a Canadian basketball player. He competed in the men's tournament at the 1964 Summer Olympics.

References

1936 births
Living people
Canadian men's basketball players
Olympic basketball players of Canada
Basketball players at the 1964 Summer Olympics
Basketball players from Toronto